A voter invitation card, voter notification card, poll card, or notice of election card, is an informational leaflet, usually of the size of a postcard, which requests voters to attend the elections and which generally contains information regarding elections, place and time of voting, and contact details of the electoral commission.

By country

France 

In France, the voter invitation card also serves as a certificate that the voter is registered on the Electoral roll, and are intended to be kept and used for multiple election cycles.

Until 1993, French voter invitation cards were titled as "CARTE D'ÉLECTEUR". Starting with the 1994 European Parliament election in France, voter invitation cards are titled using the gender-neutral "CARTE ÉLECTORALE". This was done in response to the demands of women's movements, which requested titling voter invitation cards separately by the invitee's gender ("CARTE D'ÉLECTEUR" for men and "CARTE D'ÉLECTRICE" for women), despite a recommendation by the Académie française to continue titling all voter invitation cards as "CARTE D'ÉLECTEUR".

USSR 

The USSR voter cards are often called "All come to vote" cards because during the Soviet Union period they inevitably carried an inscription, a slogan "All come to vote". One side of such voter invitation cards usually was artistically illustrated, while the other (reverse) side contained information. The text on such voter cards during the Soviet time carried invariable components: words "Dear comrade _. Please be reminded that on Sunday …"; and an appeal to come and vote for candidates of the electoral bloc of communists and independents. Voter invitation cards were sent on behalf of "trustee persons of the constituency election campaign conference of workers' representatives", campaign team, and were always characterized by electoral campaign propaganda, requesting to vote for the candidates of the electoral bloc of communists and independents.

Russian Federation 
In Russia voter invitation cards are no longer electoral campaign propaganda. Their function is only to inform of elections, time of voting and location of the polling station, and more often than not contain only text without any images.

United Kingdom 

A poll card is a document which is sent to all registered voters by the returning officer shortly before an election in the United Kingdom. The poll card gives information about the election, such as the date of the election, the location and opening times of the voter's polling station, and the name, address and electoral number of the voter.

It is not necessary to take the card to the polling station to vote.

Poll cards were introduced as part of the Representation of the People Act 1948, and the first general election in which they were used was that of 1950.

Tunisia 

In Tunisia, the Ministry of the Interior organizes and manages the votes from 1959 until 2009 by presenting the voter's card and the national identity card. But following the Tunisian revolution in 2011, the Independent High Authority for Elections is responsible for the management of elections and referendums, their organization and their supervision in their different phases. From this date, the voter card is no longer used.

External references 
 Come One, Come All to Vote...
 A. Savelieva. Vote. (Савельева А. А. Отдай голос.) in Russian
 All Russian voters will be sent two voter invitation cards for the Duma elections (Все российские избиратели получат по два приглашения на думские выборы). in Russian
 Invitations for Kids Party

References

Voting